Nikola Jolović (Serbian Cyrillic: Никола Јоловић; born 4 May 1979) is a Serbian retired professional footballer who played as a defender.

Club career
Jolović spent three seasons with Zemun, before transferring to Russian club Torpedo Moscow in the summer of 2001. He stayed there until the summer of 2005, before moving to Saturn. Jolović also played for Azerbaijani club Inter Baku, before returning to his homeland in 2008. He finished his football career after playing with Čukarički and OFK Beograd in the Serbian SuperLiga.

International career
Jolović made six appearances and scored one goal for the Yugoslav national under-21 team during the qualification campaign for the 2002 UEFA Under-21 Championship.

Career statistics

External links
 
 Sportbox profile  
 

Association football defenders
Expatriate footballers in Azerbaijan
Expatriate footballers in Russia
FC Saturn Ramenskoye players
FC Torpedo Moscow players
FK Čukarički players
FK Zemun players
OFK Beograd players
Russian Premier League players
Serbia and Montenegro under-21 international footballers
Serbian expatriate footballers
Serbian expatriate sportspeople in Azerbaijan
Serbian expatriate sportspeople in Russia
Serbian footballers
Serbian SuperLiga players
Footballers from Belgrade
1979 births
Living people